Yuqiao Subdistrict is a subdistrict located on northern part of Tongzhou District, Beijing. It borders Zhongcang and Tongyun Subdistricts to its north, Yongshun Town to its east, Zhangjiawan Town to its southeast, Liyuan Town to its southwest, and Beiyuan Subdistrict to its northwest. The population of the subdistrict was 115,813 as of the 2020 census.

History 
In 1948, four townships under Tongxian were merged into the newly created Tongzhou City. The city was changed ro Tongzhou town in 1950. In 1997, It was disbanded, and Yuqiao Subdistrict was formed on land that was previously Yunhe Subdistrict of Tongzhou Town.

Administrative divisions 
As of 2021, Yuqiao Subdistrict had direct jurisdiction over 18 communities:

Gallery

See also 

 List of township-level divisions of Beijing

References 

Tongzhou District, Beijing
Subdistricts of Beijing